FCX may refer to:
FCX file compression, an older file compression utility and format used on VAX and personal computers.
Honda FCX, a family of hydrogen fuel cell automobiles from Honda
Honda FCX Clarity, a new-generation hydrogen fuel cell car from Honda
Freeport-McMoRan, a mining company whose NYSE ticker symbol is FCX
Bell FCX-001, a concept helicopter by Bell Helicopter